Tokio is an unincorporated community in southeastern Benson County, North Dakota, United States, on the Spirit Lake Indian Reservation. It lies southeast of the city of Minnewaukan, the county seat of Benson County. It has a post office with the ZIP code 58379.

History
Tokio was established in 1906 as a station along the Great Northern Railway. The post office was opened in 1907, and remains in operation today. A railroad official chose the name Tokio, based on the local Dakota word to-ki, or "gracious gift." However, some believe it is named after the city of Tokyo in Japan.

References

Unincorporated communities in Benson County, North Dakota
Unincorporated communities in North Dakota
Populated places established in 1906
1906 establishments in North Dakota